David Evangelista is a fashion/beauty contributor to The Early Show, as well as a guest judge on Iron Chef America and a well known red carpet regular who seeks Joan Rivers as his rival. He was nominated for five Emmy Awards for the hairstyling he did on The Rosie O'Donnell Show.  He is openly gay.

He is well known for his contributions to The Early Show, including his makeover segments, his take on red-carpet fashion, as well as just regular tips on fashion and beauty. Since 2002, he has been a regular contributor, appearing on the show at least once a month.

He also served as a judge on the CBS reality competition show Wickedly Perfect in 2005 and as host on The Fashion Team from 2006 to 2007.

He is a very close friend of both Phoebe Cates and Ricki Lake, and was a friend of Joan Rivers, and has been seen with the likes of Steven Cojocaru, critiquing celebrities as they "strut their stuff" on the red carpet.

He is also a friend of Rachael Ray and Alton Brown of The Food Network fame.  In 2006, he was invited to serve as an Iron Chef America guest judge at the request of both Alton Brown and Rachael Ray.  He became a memorable guest judge on the show for his strict, but gentle comments towards the chefs in each episode. To this date Evangelista has guest judged over 6 times on Iron Chef: America'', and served as a guest judge in the most memorable episode to date ; in which Rachael Ray served up her best in a contest against Italian chef Giada de Laurentiis.

In addition to his celebrity status, David owned and operated his own salon as a component of Cornelia Fifth Avenue Spa on 51st Street and 5th Avenue in New York, NY. He also has his own brand of hair and beauty products which are sold online, as well as on QVC and the Home Shopping Network.

He is the cousin of actors Roberto Lombardi and Gina Lombardi and stylist Kevin Gatto, as well as the nephew of actress Dolores M. Lombardi. He is also cousin to the carpenter Scott McGregor.

Emmy Awards

External links
His Website
His page on The Early Show

TV.com page for David Evangelista

Living people
American hairdressers
American fashion journalists
American gay writers
American LGBT broadcasters
1968 births
21st-century LGBT people